The Queen's Flower is a 1946 Romanian short film directed by Paul Călinescu. It was entered into the 1946 Cannes Film Festival.

Cast
 Ioana Călinescu
 Ileana Niculescu
 Traian Vrajbă

References

External links

1946 films
1946 fantasy films
Romanian-language films
Romanian black-and-white films
Films directed by Paul Călinescu
Romanian fantasy films